The Principality of Bitlis, also known as the Bitlis Khanate and the Bitlis Emirate (1182–early 19th century) was a Kurdish principality originated from the Rojaki (or Rozagi) tribal confederation. The Rojaki defeated the Georgian King David the Curopalate and conquered Bitlis and Sasun in the 10th century. The principality occasionally came under the rule of outsiders, such as the Aq Qoyunlu (from 1467 to 1495) and the Safavids (from 1507 to 1514). After the decline of the Aq Qoyunlu, the Rojaki princes asserted their independence. The principality supported the Ottoman Sultan Selim I and its rulers were named Noble Khans in return. In 1531, the Rojaki prince withdrew his support for the Ottomans and turned towards the Safavids instead, an event that lead to the capture of the principality by the Ottomans.

A good era for the principality began in 1578, as Sultan Murad III nominated Sharaf al-Din Bitlisi the Emir of the principality. Until 1596, eighteen Rojaki princes ruled the principality.

The Rojaki khans maintained their relative independence during the long rivalry between the Ottomans and the Safavids. In 1665, Abdal Khan's status as the Emir of the principality was strengthened after a visit to Bitlis by the Ottoman sultan Murad IV as he supported the Ottomans in their feud with the Safavids. Abdal Khan has been described by the French traveller Jean-Baptiste Tavernier as the most powerful Kurdish prince. According to him, Abdal Khan was independent and did not acknowledge the Safavid or Ottoman states. Evliya Çelebi has praised Abdal Khan as a renaissance prince and owner of a library of books in several languages. Several European travelers noted the ability of the emirate to call in militias (up to 12,000 cavalry forces) in order to defend itself. The autonomy of the principality ended in 1655 as Emir Abdal Khan entered into conflict with the Malik Ahmad Pasha, the Wāli of Van at the time. Abdal Khan was accused of confiscating properties in Bitlis by merchants in Van and an his closeness with the Yazidis. As result, the Ottoman Empire ended its tolerance towards the autonomy of the principality of Bitlis.

In the 18th century the rulers of the principality switched frequently due to inter-genetational conflict.Eventually in the early 19th century Bitlis became a part of the Emirate of Muş and the khans lost their position as administrators.

See also
 List of Kurdish dynasties and countries

References

Further reading
 

Kurdish dynasties
Principality of Bitlis
States and territories disestablished in 1847
1182 establishments in Asia
Safavid Iran
Vassal states of the Ottoman Empire